Home and Away is an Australian soap opera. It was first broadcast on the Seven Network on 17 January 1988. The following is a list of characters that first appeared in 2002 by order of first appearance. They were all introduced by the show's Series Producer Julie McGuaran. The 15th season of Home and Away began airing on the Seven Network on 14 January 2002. The first introduction of year was Sebastian Elmaloglou as Max Sutherland. Rhett Giles joined the cast as Paris Burnett in April. Laurie Foell arrived as Deputy Principal Angie Russell in September and was joined by her son Dylan (Brett Hicks-Maitland) in October.

Max Sutherland

Max Sutherland, portrayed by Sebastian Elmaloglou, made his first appearance on 21 January 2002 and departed on 1 September 2004. Following guest appearances on various television serials including GP. Max was Elmaloglou's first ongoing role
He told the serial's official website how he differed from his character.  "He is nothing like me because he is accused for everything as he is very cheeky and I'm not like that". Around the time of his debut, Elmaloglou began watching repeats of Home and Away starring his sister, Rebekah who played Sophie Simpson. "It is so funny watching Rebekah because she looks completely different. I have been told that when I was a baby and we were out together as a family, people would go up to Bec and ask her if I was her baby, after she had the baby on the show".

Max arrives in Summer Bay with his father, Pete (Christopher Mayer) to stay with his uncle Rhys (Michael Beckley) and aunt Shelley (Paula Forrest). Max's stay with his relatives becomes permanent when Pete flees to Hong Kong to escape gambling debts. He struggles to adjust to his new life but quickly makes a friend in caravan park resident Colleen Smart (Lyn Collingwood). He is also often in trouble at school along with his cousin Kirsty (Christie Hayes). Max later helps Colleen write a book under the pen-name "Maxine Peterson". He is also the centre of a small love triangle with Tamara Simpson (Sophie Luck) and Caitlin (Bree Beadman), who both want him to dedicate the book to them but both disappear from his life. Max then finds Tasha Andrews (Isabel Lucas), a disoriented girl on the beach and quickly becomes friendly with her. Eloise Lennox (Suzanne McEachernn), a new student at Summer Bay High catches Max's eye but has a hard time getting to know her due to her overprotective parents. Eloise reveals she is dying of Leukaemia and Max helps her live out her final wishes. After a date, Eloise dies in Max's arms.

Max creates a memorial place for Eloise in an abandoned mineshaft, but it collapses when Rhys, Kirsty and Jade (Kate Garven) arrive to find him. They are all eventually rescued. When Rhys marries Beth Hunter (Clarissa House, following his divorce from Shelley, Max has to contend with her younger children, twins Henry (Tobi Atkins) and Matilda (Indiana Evans), who are frequently rude to the Sutherlands due to being uprooted from their boarding school. Max and Henry do not get along at first and do not see eye to eye. After Principal Hyde (Ivar Kants) catches Henry holding Max in a headlock he sentences them to a boxing match which Henry wins after Max is distracted. Max and Henry both become friends in time. Max had a short attraction to Matilda but she rebuffs him. Following the collapse of the Sutherland family and Rhys reconciling with Shelley, Max begins to feel out of place in the bay and feels betrayed by Rhys and Shelley. In spite of being offered a home with his uncle and aunt in the city, Max decides to leave Summer Bay to attend boarding school.

Channel 5 chose the 2003 season finale where Max and his family fall into a Mineshaft as one their best ever episodes. In 2017, Daniel Kilkelly of Digital Spy praised the character's plots, saying "He was one of the few soap kids who actually had some decent storylines, including love triangles, boxing showdowns, his girlfriend's untimely death, and even a shock mineshaft collapse. Blimey – and he was only there for less than three years!"

Paris Burnett

Paris Burnett, played by Rhett Giles, made his first appearance on 29 April 2002 and departed on 10 September 2003. Giles previously appeared on All Saints, which is filmed in a neighbouring studio at the Seven Network, and he returned there after finishing his stint in Home and Away.

Paris arrives to take over as principal of Summer Bay High from Donald Fisher (Norman Coburn) who has been suspended during a departmental plot to close the school. Paris meets Irene Roberts (Lynne McGranger) and both are immediately attracted to each other but deny it. When they both attend Noah Lawson (Beau Brady) and Hayley Smith's (Bec Cartwright) flat-painting party, Both Irene and Paris discover they have a great deal in common including losing previous partners.

Paris is able to save the school after Donald is given some incriminating information about the department's incompetence from Brett Egan (Emmanuel Marshall). He grows closer to Irene and at the end of a date, he wants to kiss her but backs out. Donald is reinstated and Irene decides she cannot be with Paris as he is going to leave and both find it difficult to be around one another.
They both attend the Summer Bay 150th anniversary dinner on board the Mirgini, but end up caught in a storm and are shipwrecked on an island where they share a kiss. After being rescued, they begin a relationship but Irene's foster son Nick Smith (Chris Egan) disapproves and feels Paris is too young for Irene. Paris is later offered a job in Orange, but agrees to return and he and Irene share a fond farewell.

Paris returns several months later to take over from Donald, following his retirement. Angie Russell (Laurie Foell) is annoyed as she thought she would be in line for promotion. Irene is reluctant to resume things but Paris works hard to convince her to do so and they reunite and Paris moves into the Beach House. Nick's behaviour is hard to contend with and he moves out again. He and Irene get back together after she is diagnosed with depression. However, this is short-lived as Paris receives a phone call telling him his brother and sister-in-law have been killed in a car crash and he has to return to the city to care for his orphaned niece and nephew. He asks Irene to join him but she tells him she cannot leave the bay. They share a sad goodbye and one final kiss before Paris leaves town.

Angie Russell

Angela "Angie" Russell, played by Laurie Foell. She made her first screen appearance during the episode broadcast on 26 September 2002 and departed on 21 March 2003, but her character subsequently appeared as a ghost in her daughter's dreams on 24 May 2004. The revelation of Angie's killer and the aftermath raised audience figures in Australia to 1.5 million viewers, beating the Nine Network's Big Brother. A writer for What's on TV included Angie on their list of "The 50 most evil soap villains of all time". The writer stated "Actress Laurie Foell caused chaos not once but TWICE in Home and Away as evil Angela Russell and, later, as Angie's twisted cousin Josie." A writer from the Sunday Mercury described Angie as a "crackpot" and opined that the serial should "take lessons from British soaps about how to milk storylines", before adding "They won't be dragging this one out for months, as the killer confesses next week!"

Dylan Russell

Dylan Russell, played by Brett Hicks-Maitland, made his first appearance on 8 October 2002 and departed in 2003. He returned for several episodes in 2004. Adelaide-born Hicks-Maitland, a graduate of NIDA, relocated to Sydney to secure acting work. Producers were impressed and offered him a longer stint in the role of Dylan. Several years after leaving the serial, Maitland-Hicks was still being recognized as Dylan.

On the serial's official website Hicks-Maitland described his character "as 17 year old with the maturity of a 19 year old and the looks of a 20 year old, but, having said that, he is still growing up. I think Dylan is a really level headed guy who is quite compassionate." Maitland Hicks was 24 when he secured the role of Dylan. "I think it is great playing a younger character, it just means that when I am 30 I can play a 25 year old, it is great for career longevity to be able to play younger roles". A writer for Home and Away's website described Dylan as "Tall and lithe, with great looks and a sense of detached mystery about him" and referred to him as a "lone wolf by conditioning - socially adept, there is still a sense that he has always been the centre of his own universe." They also compared his wit with Nick Smith's (Chris Egan) boyish humour.
 
Dylan arrives in Summer Bay after his mother Angie (Laurie Foell) becomes Deputy Principal of the local school. He soon forms a relationship with Kirsty Sutherland (Christie Hayes). The relationship is met with disapproval from Angie. After Angie tells Dylan that Kirsty's father Rhys (Michael Beckley) is also his father, Dylan quickly puts an end to the relationship. Dylan gradually grows closer to his new-found family is torn between them and Angie, however, his decision is made easier when Angie's behavior becomes increasingly unstable as she plays mind games with Nick and begins causing trouble for Sally Fletcher (Kate Ritchie). Dylan later suffers an accident with a boat engine and needs a blood transfusion but when Rhys steps up, tests reveal that Dylan is not a Sutherland at all. Dylan is hurt that Angie lied, but the Sutherlands let him know he is always welcome. He and Kirsty try to resume their relationship but it does not feel right for either.

After realising Angie has mental problems, Dylan decides to leave town with her to get help but before they can leave, Dylan and Angie get into a heated argument which results in Dylan shoving Angie, causing her to fall and hit her head on a coffee table, killing her instantly. The truth is only revealed when Rhys, one of many suspects is about to be formally charged. He is then arrested and bailed and relocates to the city with his grandmother Monica Markham (Barbara Morton). Dylan is later acquitted of murder at the trial. Dylan returns to meet his long-lost half-sister, Tasha Andrews (Isabel Lucas) and is shocked at how much she looks like their late mother. He also tracks down Angie's lookalike Cousin, Josie (also played by Foell) at her brothel in the city when Tasha goes missing.

The episode featuring Dylan's confession to killing Angie, written by Fiona Kelly was nominated for an Australian Writer's Guild Award in 2004.

Others

References

, 2002
, Home and Away